Bonez Adventures: Tomb of Fulaos is a Czech action-adventure video game developed and published by Bone Artz on 8 July 2005 on Windows.

Production 
By March 2007, the game had been localised into Russian, Polish, and Czech.

Plot and gameplay 
The player takes the role of archaeologist Marc Bonez, who discovers a mummy that is much older than the tomb in which he lies. It is up to Bonez to discover the truth.

The game is divided into chapters, which each chapter having a different form of gameplay, ranging from an action RPG to a traditional point and click adventure.

Critical reception 
Igromania thought it was a weak piece of work. Absolute Games felt there were better alternatives for players, such as Diablo or Quest for Glory. Sector dismissed the title as a clone of Indiana Jones. Gamestar noted how the camera became a hindrance to players when trying to solve puzzles.

References

External links 
 Official site

 Gry Online review
 Gry Online news article
 Onet review
2005 video games
Action-adventure games
Role-playing video games
Fantasy video games
Video games developed in the Czech Republic
Windows games
Windows-only games
Single-player video games